Ouk Sothy (born 5 October 1987) is a former Cambodian footballer who last played as a midfielder for Phnom Penh Crown and the Cambodia national football team. His nickname is Messi which is given by his teammates. He is currently work as head coach of Soltilo Angkor in the Cambodian League and assistant coach of Cambodia national football team.

Honors

Club

Phnom Penh Crown
Cambodian League: 2014, 2015

References

1987 births
Living people
Cambodian footballers
Cambodia international footballers
Phnom Penh Crown FC players
Sportspeople from Phnom Penh
Association football midfielders